Homoranthus montanus is a plant in the myrtle family Myrtaceae and is endemic to a small area in southern Queensland. It has narrow leaves and up to one to six small tubular, cream-coloured flowers arranged in leaf axils near the ends of the branchlets. As the flowers age, they turn red.

Description
Flowers and fruits sporadically throughout the year, mostly October to November.

Taxonomy and naming
Homoranthus montanus was first formally described in 1991 by Lyndley Craven and S.R Jones and the description was published in Australian Systematic Botany. The specific epithet (montanus) is a Latin word meaning "of mountains".

Distribution and habitat
Restricted to Ballandean and  Mount Jibbinbar Queensland. Grows on shallow sandy soils in woodland and heath on and around granite outcrops.

Conservation
Homoranthus montanus is listed as "vulnerable" under the Australian Government EPBC Act.
A very rare species known from two small populations. IUCN (2010) considered vulnerable.

References

External links
 The Australasian Virtual Herbarium – Occurrence data for Homoranthus montanus

Flora of Queensland
Myrtales of Australia
montanus
Plants described in 1991